CBS News Now is the de facto umbrella title for a set of hybrid local/national newscasts produced by CBS News and Stations airing on most of the group's CW affiliates or independent stations, with production led by the CBS Local News Innovation Lab at the studios of KTVT / KTXA in Fort Worth, Texas. In markets where the company has a full news operation, the newscast is named after the applicable CBS News Local streaming service, while in other markets (including those where CBS owns a station that carries the newscast, but the CBS network affiliate is owned by a third party) the title follows the format [Location] Now News.

The program, which generally airs at either 9:00 or 10:00 p.m. local time, includes short local news and weather briefs, presented by a local anchor (or in some cases a surrogate anchor hosting remotely), but consists mainly of nationally-oriented news coverage produced in Fort Worth. The newscast's initial national anchors are Tom Hanson on weeknights and Trason Bragg on weekends.

The format debuted on July 18, 2022, on the following stations:
 WLNY-TV Riverhead/New York (as CBS News New York Now at 9:00 on WLNY-TV 10/55)
 WPSG Philadelphia (as CBS News Philadelphia Now at 10:00 on The CW Philly)
 KTXA Fort Worth/Dallas (as CBS News Texas Now at 9:00 on TXA 21)
 WUPA Atlanta (as Atlanta Now News at 10:00 on Atlanta's CW 69)
 KBCW San Francisco (as CBS News Bay Area Now at 10:00 on KBCW)
 WSBK Boston (as CBS News Boston Now at 10:00 on TV38)
 KSTW Seattle (as Seattle Now News at 10:00 on CW 11)
 WTOG St. Petersburg/Tampa (as Tampa Bay Now News at 10:00 on CW 44)
 WKBD Detroit (as Detroit Now News at 10:00 on CW 50)
 WBFS Miami (as CBS News Miami Now at 9:00 on TV33)

See also
 News Central, similar newscasts produced by Sinclair Broadcast Group from 2002 to 2006

Footnotes

References

2020s American television news shows
English-language television shows
Local news programming in the United States
CBS News and Stations
2022 American television series debuts